Alexis Adelin Beka Beka (born 29 March 2001) is a French professional footballer who plays as a defensive midfielder for  club Nice.

Club career

Caen 
Beka Beka made his debut with Caen in a 0–0 Ligue 2 tie with Clermont on 20 December 2019. He signed his first professional contract with the club on 9 June 2020.

Lokomotiv Moscow 
On 23 August 2021, Beka Beka signed a five-year contract with Russian Premier League club Lokomotiv Moscow.

OGC Nice
On 1 August 2022, Beka Beka signed for Ligue 1 club OGC Nice on a five-year deal, for a reported fee of €14 million.

International career 
Beka Beka is a youth international for France. He was part of the France Olympic team that competed at the 2020 Summer Olympics.

Personal life
Born in France, Beka Beka is of Congolese descent.

Career statistics

References

External links

 
 
 
 
 SM Caen Profile

2001 births
Footballers from Paris
French sportspeople of Democratic Republic of the Congo descent
Black French sportspeople
Living people
French footballers
France youth international footballers
Association football defenders
Association football midfielders
Stade Malherbe Caen players
FC Lokomotiv Moscow players
OGC Nice players
Championnat National 3 players
Ligue 2 players
Russian Premier League players
Ligue 1 players
Footballers at the 2020 Summer Olympics
Olympic footballers of France
French expatriate footballers
Expatriate footballers in Russia
French expatriate sportspeople in Russia